Montecchio Maggiore is a town and comune in the province of Vicenza, Veneto, Italy.

Montecchio Maggiore borders the following municipalities: Altavilla Vicentina, Arzignano, Brendola, Castelgomberto, Montebello Vicentino, Montorso Vicentino, Sovizzo, Trissino, Zermeghedo.

History

The land of Montecchio Maggiore has been inhabited since the late Stone Age, though it was invaded and occupied many times. Two castles built about 975 are claimed to be the inspiration for the Romeo and Juliet legend. Luigi da Porto of Vicenza set the story here in his novel of 1552.

Main sights

 Villa Cordellina Lombardi, is a masterpiece of neo-Palladian architect Giorgio Massari, with 18th-century frescoes by Giovanni Battista Tiepolo.
Museum Zannato, founded in 1922 by Giuseppe Zannato, its first curator. It has sections devoted to archaeological and paleontological finds. Some of these contain materials found in the late-Roman necropolis of Carpanè. There is also an important gemological section.
Castle Bellaguardia (called "Castle of Juliet")
Castello della Villa (called "Castle of Romeo")

International relations

 
Montecchio Maggiore is twinned with:
 Passau, Germany, from 2003
 Alton, Hampshire, United Kingdom
 Carloforte, Italy, from 2009.

References

Sources
(Google Maps)

External links
Giambattista Tiepolo, 1696-1770, a full text exhibition catalog from The Metropolitan Museum of Art, which includes material on Montecchio Maggiore

Cities and towns in Veneto